Memory/Vision is an album by British saxophonist and improvisor Evan Parker's Electro-Acoustic Ensemble recorded in 2002 and released on the ECM label.

Reception

The AllMusic review by Thom Jurek awarded the album 4 stars stating "this is one of the most emotionally resonant works Parker has given listeners. And one hopes that such a description will not insult his brilliant mind or his aesthetic sensibilities. Wonderful".  

The authors of the Penguin Guide to Jazz Recordings awarded the album 4 stars, and wrote: "The single continuous performance has both a monumental quality and a strong sense of process and flux, like a sculpture made of plasma rather than stone or bronze."

In a review for The Guardian, John Fordham called the music "an extended piece of composition deploying some comparatively orthodox narrative notions about highs and lows, episodes of dramatic intensity and quiet reflection," and commented: "It's for a pretty specialised audience, but close followers and new converts to Parker's uncompromising creativity may well be intrigued."

Chris Kelsey, writing for Jazz Times, stated: "Textures ebb and flow; slow and sparse morphs into fast and dense. The musicians are all very sensitive and reactive free improvisers, as are the sound-processing guys, for the most part."

The BBC's Peter Marsh wrote: "This is music that hangs in the air, sometimes vaporous, sometimes almost sculptural in its weight. Parker's structures make this a rewarding (and repeatable) experience, and the spacious, pristine production gives each sound room to breathe. Luscious, alien stuff, and utterly beautiful."

In an article for All About Jazz, Jerry D'Souza remarked: "Time and structure go through various dimensions. Structure is broken, time fragmented, in a flow that ebbs and eddies. When the machines are the end voice, the ideas that leap out in jiggles and squeals and whirs are mesmerising. There is also the strength that derives from the playing."

Beppe Colli of Clocks and Clouds stated: "Evan Parker has succeeded in producing a work... which could not exist without modern technology but which is not slave to it in ways that today are all-too-common on a mass market - or à la mode. A work that is aesthetically accessible while being interesting at the same time. Which, given the present times, is definitely not to be underestimated."

Track listing
All compositions by Evan Parker
 "Part 1" - 10:22   
 "Part 2" - 11:18   
 "Part 3" - 5:09   
 "Part 4" - 13:21   
 "Part 5" - 12:43   
 "Part 6" - 9:10   
 "Part 7" - 8:31
Recorded live at Norges Musikkhøgskole in Oslo, Sweden in October 2002.

Personnel
 Evan Parker - soprano saxophone, tapes and samples
 Philipp Wachsmann - violin, electronics
Agustí Fernandez - piano, prepared piano
 Barry Guy - double bass
 Paul Lytton - percussion, electronics
Lawrence Casserley - signal processing instrument
Joel Ryan - computer, sound-processing
 Walter Prati - electronics, sound processing
 Marco Vecchi - electronics, sound processing

References

ECM Records live albums
Evan Parker live albums
2003 albums